Maria Soccor is an American actor, director, and producer. Her acting credits include Another World (1998), Pizza My Heart (2005), K-Ville (2007), and NCIS: New Orleans (2015) as well as a number of short films and television films.

Biography 

Soccor got her start at the age of 13 modeling in print ads for various beauty and Fortune 500 companies. She studied acting in Orange, New Jersey at The Children's Matinee Workshop under Gwen Guthrie. In her senior year of high school, in 1992, she won first place in the annual national America's Junior Miss scholarship pageant as a representative from Essex County, New Jersey. She continued her acting studies under the late three-time Tony Award winner Uta Hagen before appearing on Broadway and in several Off-Broadway productions. One of her first big roles was in Club XII, MC Lyte's Off-Broadway hip-hop rendering of Shakespeare's Twelfth Night. She returned to the New York stage in February 2019 to star in The Sandstorm, presented during the New York Theater Festival Winterfest. In 2021, she starred in the New Jersey production of Mannequin Diaries written by Brian Wiggins and directed by Tony Award winner Trazana Beverley. 

In addition to acting, Soccor began directing and producing documentaries in 2009. In 2016, she directed Lords of BSV, which won 13 awards across the world, including Best Director of a Feature Documentary at the Madrid International Film Festival. In 2018, she wrote, directed, and acted in Kicks, which was a Cannes Film Festival entry. She is currently in production on Tillie, Freestyle Music: The Legacy, and Sybil in Her Own Words.

In 2015, Soccor created a comic series called SPEAR, illustrated by artist Rolo Ledesma. It launched in October that year at New York Comic Con.

She is a member of the Film Fatales, Alliance of Women Directors, and New York Women in Film & Television organizations.

Filmography

Film

Television

Music videos

References

External links

American film directors
20th-century American actresses
21st-century American actresses
20th-century Filipino actresses
21st-century Filipino actresses
American film actresses
American television actresses
American voice actresses
Filipino voice actresses
Living people
Year of birth missing (living people)